The Russian Women's Basketball Premier League is the premier women's basketball competition in Russia. The category consists of 11 teams playing a total of 20 rounds. At the end of the regular season the top eight teams play the play-offs throughout April, ending in a 5 matches final.

UMMC Ekaterinburg is the most successful team in the championship with 15 titles, including a record 13-year winning streak. Defunct team CSKA Moscow, later relocated to Samara as VBM-SGAU Samara (9), Dynamo Moscow (4) and Spartak Moscow Region (2) follow in the palmares. Thanks to large number of foreign players, WBPL teams have been successful in the Euroleague since the 2000s, with Spartak Moscow Region winning 4 titles in a row (a competition record since 1976), UMMC Ekaterinburg winning 6 titles, and VBM-SGAU Samara and Dynamo Kursk one each.

History

2017–18 season teams
 Dynamo Kursk
 Dynamo Moscow
 Dynamo Novosibirsk
 UMMC Ekaterinburg
 Nadezhda Orenburg
 Spartak Moscow Region
 Spartak Noginsk
 Enisey Krasnoyarsk
 Kazanochka Kazan
 MBA Moscow
 Inventa Kursk

List of winners

Awards

References

Basketball leagues in Russia
Russia
Women's basketball in Russia
Sports leagues established in 1992
Professional sports leagues in Russia